William M. Gaugler (5 August 1931 – 10 December 2011) was an American archaeologist specializing in Etruscology and a prominent fencing master.

Career

Gaugler was inspired to take up fencing by reading as early as 1943 the treatise On Fencing by the great Italian fencer Aldo Nadi.  In 1956 he became one of the last students of Nadi in Los Angeles.  In 1958 Gaugler went to Europe where he studied at the French Military Fencing Master's School, with several masters in Italy, and in Germany.   He earned his fencing master's diploma from the Accademia Nazionale di Scherma in Naples, Italy, in 1976, thus qualifying to teach fencing.

Upon his return to the United States, Gaugler obtained a faculty position in 1969 in the art history and archaeology department at San José State University where in 1979 he established the Fencing Masters Program of which he was director until his retirement.  In 2008 the fencing master's program affiliated with Santa Clara Adult Education and continues to be the only program of its kind in the United States. 

Gaugler regularly corresponded with Aldo Nadi until the latter's death in 1965.  Gaugler provided an introduction and afterward to Nadi's autobiography The Living Sword when it was published posthumously in 1995.

Works
 Fechten für Anfänger und Fortgeschrittene Florett, Säbel, Degen (München, Nymphenburger Verlagsbuchhandlung, 1983) [2nd ed. 1986; 3rd ed. Heyne, 2004]
 Fencing Everyone (Winston-Salem, N.C. : Hunter Textbooks, 1987) 
 The Science of Fencing: a Comprehensive Training Manual for Master and Student, Including Lesson Plans for Foil, Sabre and Epée Instruction (Bangor, Maine: Laureate Press, 1997)  [2nd ed. 2004]
 The History of Fencing: Foundations of Modern European Swordplay   (Bangor, Maine: Laureate Press, 1997) 
 A Dictionary of Universally Used Fencing Terminology: with approval of the Joint Board of Accreditation of the United States Fencing Association Coaches College and the San Jose State Univ. Fencing Masters Program  (Bangor, Maine: Laureate Press, 1997)
 The Tomb of Lars Porsenna at Clusium and Its Religious and Political Implications (Bangor, Maine: Laureate Press, 2002)

Gaugler also published numerous articles on fencing technique, history, and pedagogy.  See bibliography maintained by  the 
Accademia di Scherma Classica.

References 

1931 births
2011 deaths
American fencers
American fencing coaches
20th-century American archaeologists
San Jose State University faculty
20th-century American male writers